University of Liepāja is a university in Liepāja, Latvia.

General Information
Liepaja University, founded in 1954, is an accredited state higher educational establishment, which implements study programmes at all three study levels: basic studies, Master and Doctorate studies. The number of students is around 2000 divided over around 30 study directions. Liepaja University offers five full degree study programs taught in English: Computer science, Physics, Information Technology (Bachelor) and Information Technology, New Media Arts (Master). Liepaja University is one of the oldest higher educational establishments in the Kurzeme region.

Organization

Faculties
The University consists of four faculties:
 Faculty of Management and Social Sciences
 Faculty of Science and Engineering
 Faculty of Humanitarian sciences and Arts
 Faculty of Pedagogy and Social work

Institutes
 Institute of Educational Sciences
 Kurzeme Institute of Humanities
 Institute of Science and Innovative Technologies
 Institute of Management Sciences

References

External links
 

Universities in Latvia
Educational institutions established in 1954
1954 establishments in the Soviet Union